Paulo Thiago (8 October 1945 – 5 June 2021) was a Brazilian film director, screenwriter and producer. At the time of his death in 2021, he had directed 13 films since 1970. His 1974 film Sagarana: The Duel was entered into the 24th Berlin International Film Festival.

Selected filmography
 Sagarana: The Duel (1974)
 The Long Haul (1988)

References

External links

1945 births
2021 deaths
Brazilian film directors
Brazilian screenwriters
Brazilian film producers
People from Minas Gerais